In morphology and lexicography, a lemma (plural lemmas or lemmata) is the canonical form, dictionary form, or citation form of a set of word forms. In English, for example, break, breaks, broke, broken and breaking are forms of the same lexeme, with break as the lemma by which they are indexed. Lexeme, in this context, refers to the set of all the inflected or alternating forms in the paradigm of a single word, and lemma refers to the particular form that is chosen by convention to represent the lexeme. Lemmas have special significance in highly inflected languages such as Arabic, Turkish and Russian. The process of determining the lemma for a given lexeme is called lemmatisation. The lemma can be viewed as the chief of the principal parts, although lemmatisation is at least partly arbitrary.

Morphology 
The form of a word that is chosen to serve as the lemma is usually the least marked form, but there are several exceptions such as the use of the infinitive for verbs in some languages.

For English, the citation form of a noun is the singular (and non-possessive) form: mouse rather than mice. For multiword lexemes that contain possessive adjectives or reflexive pronouns, the citation form uses a form of the indefinite pronoun one: do one's best, perjure oneself. In European languages with grammatical gender, the citation form of regular adjectives and nouns is usually the masculine singular. If the language also has cases, the citation form is often the masculine singular nominative.

For many languages, the citation form of a verb is the infinitive: French , German , Hindustani /, Spanish . English verbs usually have an infinitive, which in its bare form (without the particle to) is its least marked (for example, break is chosen over to break, breaks, broke, breaking, and broken); for defective verbs with no infinitive the present tense is used (for example, must has only one form while shall has no infinitive, and both lemmas are their lexemes' present tense forms). For Latin, Ancient Greek, Modern Greek, and Bulgarian, the first person singular present tense is traditionally used, but some modern dictionaries use the infinitive instead (except for Bulgarian, which lacks infinitives; for contracted verbs in Ancient Greek, an uncontracted first person singular present tense is used to reveal the contract vowel:  philéō for  philō "I love" [implying affection],  agapáō for  agapō "I love" [implying regard]). Finnish dictionaries list verbs not under their root, but under the first infinitive, marked with -(t)a, -(t)ä.

For Japanese, the non-past (present and future) tense is used. For Arabic the third-person singular masculine of the past/perfect tense is the least-marked form and is used for entries in modern dictionaries. In older dictionaries, which are still commonly used, the triliteral of the word, either a verb or a noun, is used. This is similar to Hebrew, which also uses the third-person singular masculine perfect form, e.g. ברא bara'  create, כפר kaphar deny. Georgian uses the verbal noun. For Korean, -da is attached to the stem.

In Tamil, an agglutinative language, the verb stem (which is also the imperative form - the least marked one) is often cited, e.g., இரு

In Irish, words are highly inflected by case (genitive, nominative, dative and vocative) and by their place within a sentence because of initial mutations. The noun cainteoir, the lemma for the noun meaning "speaker", has a variety of forms: chainteoir, gcainteoir, cainteora, chainteora, cainteoirí, chainteoirí and gcainteoirí.

Some phrases are cited in a sort of lemma: Carthago delenda est (literally, "Carthage must be destroyed") is a common way of citing Cato, but what he said was nearer to censeo Carthaginem esse delendam ("I hold Carthage to be in need of destruction").

Lexicography 
In a dictionary, the lemma "go" represents the inflected forms "go", "goes", "going", "went", and "gone". The relationship between an inflected form and its lemma is usually denoted by an angle bracket, e.g., "went" < "go". Of course, the disadvantage of such simplifications is the inability to look up a declined or conjugated form of the word, but some dictionaries, like Webster's Dictionary, list "went". Multilingual dictionaries vary in how they deal with this issue: the Langenscheidt dictionary of German does not list ging (< gehen), but the Cassell does.

Lemmas or word stems are used often in corpus linguistics for determining word frequency. In that usage, the specific definition of "lemma" is flexible depending on the task it is being used for.

Pronunciation
A word may have different pronunciations, depending on its phonetic environment (the neighbouring sounds) or on the degree of stress in a sentence. An example of the latter is the weak and strong forms of certain English function words like some and but (pronounced ,  when stressed but ,  when unstressed). Dictionaries usually give the pronunciation used when the word is pronounced alone (its isolation form) and with stress, but they may also note common weak forms of pronunciation.

Difference between stem and lemma 
The stem is the part of the word that never changes even when morphologically inflected; a lemma is the least marked form of the word. For example, from "produced", the lemma is "produce", but the stem is "produc-". This is because there are words such as production. and producing In linguistic analysis, the stem is defined more generally as the analyzed base form from which all inflected forms can be formed. When phonology is taken into account, the definition of the unchangeable part of the word is not useful, as can be seen in the phonological forms of the words in the preceding example: "produced"  vs. "production" .

Some lexemes have several stems but one lemma. For instance the verb "to go" has the stems "go" and "went" due to suppletion: the past tense was co-opted from a different verb, "to wend".

Headword
A headword, lemma, or catchword is the word under which a set of related dictionary or encyclopaedia entries appears.  The headword is used to locate the entry, and dictates its alphabetical position.  Depending on the size and nature of the dictionary or encyclopedia, the entry may include alternative meanings of the word, its etymology, pronunciation and inflections, compound words or phrases that contain the headword, and encyclopedic information about the concepts represented by the word.

For example, the headword bread may contain the following (simplified) definitions:

Bread
(noun)
 A common food made from the combination of flour, water and yeast
 Money (slang)
(verb)
 To coat in breadcrumbs
— to know which side your bread is buttered to know how to act in your own best interests.

The Academic Dictionary of Lithuanian contains around 500,000 headwords. The Oxford English Dictionary (OED) has around 273,000 headwords along with 220,000 lemmas, while Webster's Third New International Dictionary has about 470,000. The Deutsches Wörterbuch (DWB), the largest lexicon of the German language, has around 330,000 headwords. These values are cited by the dictionary makers and may not use exactly the same definition of a headword. In addition, headwords may not accurately reflect a dictionary's physical size. The OED and the DWB, for instance, include exhaustive historical reviews and exact citations from source documents not usually found in standard dictionaries.

The term 'lemma' comes from the practice in Greco-Roman antiquity of using the word to refer to the headwords of marginal glosses in scholia; for this reason, the Ancient Greek plural form is sometimes used, namely lemmata (Greek λῆμμα, pl. λήμματα).

See also
 Lexeme
 Lexical Markup Framework
 Null morpheme
 Principal parts
 Root (linguistics)
 Uninflected word

References

External links

Lexical units
Units of linguistic morphology
Linguistics terminology